Isabelle Dussauge is a science, technology and society (STS) researcher at the Department of History of Science and Ideas, Uppsala University, Sweden and former assistant professor at the Department of Thematic Studies (technology and social change), Linköping University, Sweden. She is also the co-founder, with Anelis Kaiser, of The NeuroGenderings Network, and acted as guest editor, again with Kaiser on the journal Neuroethics.

Education 
Dussauge gained her doctorate in the history of technology from the KTH Royal Institute of Technology in 2008.

Research 
Dussauge's areas of research include: technomedical visions, computerization and health care, brain desires feminism and science, and values.

Books

References

External links 
 Official website

Cognitive neuroscientists
Date of birth unknown
Developmental psychologists
Academic staff of Linköping University
Living people
KTH Royal Institute of Technology alumni
Academic staff of Uppsala University
Swedish neuroscientists
Swedish women neuroscientists
Year of birth missing (living people)